James Bayley (15 November 1899 – 1981) was an Australian male tennis player who represented Australian in the Olympic Games. He competed in the singles event at the 1924 Summer Olympics, reaching the third round in which he lost to Brian Gilbert. With compatriot James Willard he competed in the men's doubles event and reached the second round. 

He competed in the 1924 Wimbledon Championships and reached the third round in the singles event and lost in the first round of the doubles and mixed doubles event.

References

External links
 

1899 births
1981 deaths
Australian male tennis players
Olympic tennis players of Australia
Tennis players at the 1924 Summer Olympics
Date of death missing
Tennis people from New South Wales
20th-century Australian people